Sweden was represented at the Junior Eurovision Song Contest 2006 by Molly Sandén with "Det finaste någon kan få". TV4 took over participation after Sveriges Television (SVT) withdrew after 2005.

After the 2005 Contest, SVT decided to withdraw from Junior Eurovision to participate in the revived Scandinavian contest MGP Nordic, previously held in 2002. TV4 decided to continue Sweden's participation in Junior Eurovision, remaining the only Nordic country left in the contest.

Before Junior Eurovision

Stage Junior 2006
TV4 decided to hold a national final to select the Swedish entry for the 2006 Junior Eurovision Song Contest. The show was held on 2 September at Globen in Stockholm, hosted by Agneta Sjödin and Adam Alsing. Televoting selected the winner from the 8 competing songs. Only the top three songs were announced, with Molly Sandén winning the contest as the favourite, receiving 35% of the votes for her performance of "Det finaste någon kan få".

At Junior Eurovision
On the night of the contest, held in Bucharest, Romania, Molly Sandén performed 10th in the running order of the contest, following Macedonia and preceding Greece. At the close of the voting Molly received 116 points, placing 3rd of the 15 competing entries, giving Sweden its best result at Junior Eurovision ever.

Voting

Notes

References

Junior Eurovision Song Contest
Sweden
2006